The Copa Fraternidad 1982 was the 12th Central American club championship played between 8 clubs.

Teams
Only El Salvador, Guatemala and Honduras sent representatives.

Quarterfinals

Semifinals

Final

Champion

External links
RSSSF - Copa Fraternidad

1982
1
1981–82 in Honduran football
1981–82 in Salvadoran football
1981–82 in Guatemalan football